Nicholas L. Ashe (born May 1, 1995) is an American actor and writer. He is known for starring as the role of Micah West in the drama series Queen Sugar.

Early life 
In 2012, Ashe made his acting breakthrough on Are We There Yet? television series.

Career 
Around 2012, he made it onto the final season of Are We There Yet?. Afterwards, he appeared in Philly Lawyer and the comedy Songbyrd. In 2016, Ashe got his big feature film breakthrough starring in the movie Custody with Viola Davis, which got him selected to play the role of Micah West in Queen Sugar. In 2017, he directed and wrote his short film Last Looks.

Personal life 
He identifies as queer and is in a relationship with the actor Justice Smith.

Filmography

Film

Television

Theatrical performances

Awards and nominations

References

External links 

 Nicholas L. Ashe at IMDb
 Nicholas L. Ashe at Rotten Tomatoes

1995 births
21st-century American male actors
African-American male actors
American male film actors
American male television actors
LGBT African Americans
LGBT male actors
Living people
Queer actors
Queer men
American LGBT actors
21st-century African-American people